The 1940 Denver Pioneers football team was an American football team that represented the University of Denver as a member of the Mountain States Conference (MSC) during the 1940 college football season. In their second season under head coach Cac Hubbard, the Pioneers compiled a 6–2–1 record (4–1–1 against conference opponents), tied for second in the MSC, and outscored opponents by a total of 155 to 93.

Schedule

References

Denver
Denver Pioneers football seasons
Denver Pioneers football